Victoria Priscilla Swift (born 29 January 1995) is a Trinidadian footballer who plays as a defender for Mexican Liga MX Femenil side Club León and the Trinidad and Tobago women's national team.

Early life
Swift was born in San Fernando and raised in Freeport.

High school and college career
Swift has attended the Miracle Ministries Pentecostal Secondary School in Couva and the Navarro College and the University of West Florida in the United States.

Club career
Swift has played for León in Mexico.

International career
Swift capped for Trinidad and Tobago at senior level during the 2011 Pan American Games.

References

External links
 
 
 
 
 

1995 births
Living people
People from San Fernando, Trinidad and Tobago
Trinidad and Tobago women's footballers
Women's association football defenders
West Florida Argonauts women's soccer players
Club León (women) footballers
Liga MX Femenil players
Trinidad and Tobago women's international footballers
Pan American Games competitors for Trinidad and Tobago
Footballers at the 2011 Pan American Games
Trinidad and Tobago expatriate women's footballers
Trinidad and Tobago expatriate sportspeople in the United States
Expatriate women's soccer players in the United States
Trinidad and Tobago expatriate sportspeople in Mexico
Expatriate women's footballers in Mexico